One Plus One Is One is the fourth studio album by Badly Drawn Boy, released in 2004. It is his last album for XL Recordings.

Track listing
"One Plus One Is One" – 4:18
"Easy Love" – 3:02
"Summertime in Wintertime" – 3:02
"This Is That New Song" – 4:07
"Another Devil Dies" – 5:01
"The Blossoms" – 2:01
"Year of the Rat" – 4:43
"Four Leaf Clover" – 4:19
"Fewer Words" – 1:13
"Logic of a Friend" – 4:38
"Stockport" – 2:37
"Life Turned Upside Down" – 3:24
"Takes the Glory" – 5:02
"Holy Grail" – 8:13
"Don't Ask Me I'm Only the President" (U.S. version only) – 1:36
"Plan-B" (U.S. version only) – 4:47

Personnel
 Damon Gough - vocals, acoustic and electric guitar, piano, celeste, Clavinet, Wurlitzer Fun-Maker, Hammond organ, Mellotron, Fender Rhodes piano, glockenspiel, banjo
 Alex Thomas AKA Earl Shilton - drums, timpani, gong, bells, orchestral crash cymbal
 Sean McCann - bass
 Andy Votel - tubular bells, cymbals, cowbell, chimes, samples and effects
 Bob Marsh - trumpet on track 1&5
 Roger Wickham - flute on track 2,3,5,6,14
 Chris Worsey - cello on track 1,4,13; electric cello on track 14
 Oliver Heath - violin on track 1,4,13
 Charles Ashby - percussion on track 5
 Norman Mcleod - slide guitar on track 14
 Colin Mcleod - accordion on track 14
Stockport Music Project (STOMP) - vocals on track 7,14

References

Badly Drawn Boy albums
2004 albums
XL Recordings albums